Manuela Candelaria Billinghurst López (1919 – 5 May 1967) was a Peruvian politician. In 1956 she was among the first group of women elected to Congress, serving until 1962.

Biography
Billinghurst was born in Lima in 1919, the daughter of Guillermo Billinghurst Rodríguez-Prieto and Resurrección López Rincón, a singer. Her grandfather was Guillermo Billinghurst, who had served as president from 1912 to 1914. She studied at the Pontifical Catholic University of Peru, earning a bachelor's degree.

After women gained the right to vote and stand as candidates, she contested the 1956 Chamber of Deputies elections as an independent in Lima, and was one of nine women elected to Congress. After being elected, she served on the Decentralisation Commission and the Women and Minors Commission.

After leaving Congress in 1962, she lived in the United States from 1964 to 1967, when she died in Lima.

References

1919 births
People from Lima
Pontifical Catholic University of Peru alumni
20th-century Peruvian women politicians
20th-century Peruvian politicians
Members of the Chamber of Deputies of Peru
1967 deaths
Peruvian expatriates in the United States